Sarivar Sari is a 2005 Marathi drama film directed by Gajendra Ahire. Madhura Velankar played the lead role of a free-spirited girl while Manasi Salvi, Mohan Joshi, and Neena Kulkarni played supporting roles.

Cast 

The cast includes 
Madhura Velankar as Mani
Manasi Salvi, as Vini
Neena Kulkarni as mother
Mohan Joshi as father
Bharat Jadhav as Sandip
Shreyas Talpade 
Milind Gunaji as Piyush
Sanjay Narvekar
Pratik Lade as Pratik

Soundtrack
The music is provided by Bhaskar Chandavarkar.

References

External links 
 
 Review of Sarivar Sari at gauravsabnis.blogspot.in
 

2005 films
2000s Marathi-language films
Films directed by Gajendra Ahire